Count Arseny Andreyevich Zakryevsky (September 24, 1783 or 1786 in Tver Governorate – January 23, 1865 in Florence) was a Russian statesman and Minister of the Interior from April 19, 1828 to November 19, 1831.

Son of a poor Tver nobleman of distant Polish origin, Zakrevsky began his military career in a cadet corps, from which he graduated in 1802 with the rank of junior infantry officer. By 1829 he rose to the rank of infantry general.  Between 1824 and 1831, Count Zakrevsky served as the Governor General of the Grand Duchy of Finland. Being a military man and a hard-liner, he was trusted by Emperor Nicholas I. In the period 1828–1831, he also briefly served as the Minister of Interior of the entire empire.

He was elevated to the title of count in the Finnish nobility, and was registered in the House of Nobility under the name Zakrewsky as the Finnish comital house number nine. This made him and his family "Finnish citizens", which also meant that afterwards, when out of office, they did not need passports to go to the territory of the grand duchy from the Russian side of the border, a coveted privilege.

References

|-

1780s births
1865 deaths
Politicians of the Russian Empire
Russian commanders of the Napoleonic Wars
Governors of the Grand Duchy of Finland
Members of the State Council (Russian Empire)
Governors-General of Moscow